Kuczbork-Osada  is a village in Żuromin County, Masovian Voivodeship, in east-central Poland. It is the seat of the gmina (administrative district) called Gmina Kuczbork-Osada.

The village has a population of 1500.

External links
 Jewish Community in Kuczbork on Virtual Shtetl

References

Kuczbork-Osada
Płock Governorate
Warsaw Voivodeship (1919–1939)